The CEO Show with Robert Reiss is a national US  19-minute interview format radio program in which Robert Reiss interviews Chief Executive Officers (CEOs) of companies. The purpose of the show is to share business practices.

History
The program was first shown in Greenwich, Connecticut from WGCH AM radio in April 2007, and expanded to a national format in September of the same year. The CEO Show is broadcast nationally out of 40 cities including Atlanta, Boston, Chicago, Houston, the New York Metropolitan area, Las Vegas and, San Diego BTRN and LTRN networks  (Business Talk Radio Network and Lifestyle Talk Radio Network). Interview podcasts are available online at The CEO Show Online website.

In March 2011, The CEO Show expanded to The CEO Show Minute, a 1-minute 30 second 'best of' show transmitted over 3000 times a week.  
The CEO Show is expanded in Reiss' monthly column with Forbes.com. The CEO Show also publishes The CEO Forum, a quarterly magazine with ten CEO interviews per quarter.  Reiss also produces The CEO TV Showin a pan-Internet/mobile telephone format, where Reiss interviews the CEOs considered  most innovative.

Cast
Reiss is chairman of The Conference Board's Senior Marketing Executive Conference, which was ranked fourth C-Suite venue globally in Weber Shandwick's annual evaluation for 2009.
 
Robert G. Reiss was cited in The Harvard Business Review as "an expert in executive communications”. He is also president of Reissource LLC, a consultancy on customer service strategy.

Interviews

Executives interviewed on The CEO Show include:

Business services
 James H. Quigley, CEO, Deloitte 
 Bruce Mosler, CEO, Cushman & Wakefield 
   
Travel
 Simon F. Cooper, President, The Ritz-Carlton Hotel Company, LLC 
 David Neeleman, Founder and CEO, Jet Blue 
 
Publishing and media  
 Cathie Black, President, Hearst Magazines
 Tim & Nina Zagat, Co-Founders & Co-Chairs, Zagat Survey

Online
 Tony Hsieh, CEO, Zappos.com 
 Jay Walker, Founder, Priceline.com

Consumer products and services
 William P. Lauder, CEO, The Estee Lauder Companies 
 Leon Gorman, Chairman & 33-Year President, L.L. Bean
 Larry Janesky, CEO, Basement Systems Inc. 

Music and entertainment
 Reynold Levy, President, Lincoln Center for the Performing Arts
 Gary Loveman, CEO, Harrah's Entertainment

Non-profit
 David A. Williams, CEO, Make a Wish Foundation
 Edward T. Reilly, CEO, American Management Association

Retail
 Kip Tindell, Chairman and CEO, The Container Store
 W. Howard Lester, 22-Year CEO and Chairman, Williams-Sonoma, Inc.

Healthcare
 Patrick Charmel, President and CEO Griffin Hospital

References

External links 
 The CEO Show with Robert Reiss website
 The CEO TV Show with Robert Reiss

American talk radio programs